Novelty yarns include a wide variety of yarns made with unusual features, structure or fiber composition such as slubs, inclusions, metallic or synthetic fibers, laddering and varying thickness introduced during production. Some linens, wools to be woven into tweed, and the uneven filaments of some types of silk are allowed to retain their normal irregularities, producing the characteristic uneven surface of the finished fabric. Man-made fibres, which can be modified during production, are especially adaptable for special effects such as crimping and texturizing.

Complex yarns
Novelty yarns are sometimes referred to as complex yarns. A yarn which makes a fabric is not always smooth and uniform. Complex yarns are the uneven yarns which may be thick and thin or have curls, loops, twists and even differently coloured areas along their length. This look of the yarns are used to add interesting effects in fabrics. In complex ply two or more complex yarns are twisted around each other to form loops, curls and knots to create fancy effects. Many knitting yarns are complex ply yarns which give interesting textures in finished products. They consist of three parts: coreply yarn, effect ply and binder yarn.

Types

Bouclé
Bouclé, or looped, yarns are created by loosely looping an effect yarn around a base yarn. They can be made of any type of fiber and are usually composed of three plies, or strands, wrapped around each other. The texture is created by spinning one of the three plies more loosely than the other two. Fiber artists who choose to create projects in bouclé yarn must use extra care because if not handled carefully, the loose strand may split and snag on the knitting needles or crochet hook.

Chenille
The soft, fuzzy surface of chenille yarns, which resemble pipe cleaners in appearance, can be created in several ways. Most commonly, a fabric is first produced and then cut into narrow strips resembling a yarn. Then, when the fabric is cut, the raw edges become very fuzzy and produce the chenille appearance. Other chenilles are created by trimming a loosely attached effect fiber to create the fuzzy appearance. Still other chenilles are created by attaching or gluing fibers to the yarn.

Core
A yarn in which the core has been wrapped by another strand, such as of cotton or nylon around an elastic base as used in commercial socks.

Corkscrew or spiral
The appearance of corkscrew or spiral yarns is achieved by using yarns of two different fibers and often twisting one under a different tension than the other.

Crepe yarns
Crepe yarns may be classified as fancy yarns and are created by tightening the twist given to a yarn, resulting in a kinked or looped strand.

Eisengarn
Eisengarn, meaning "iron yarn" in English, is a light-reflecting, strong, waxed-cotton thread. It is made by soaking cotton threads in a starch, paraffin wax solution.  The threads are then stretched and polished. The end result of the process is a lustrous,  tear-resistant yarn which is extremely hardwearing.

Invented in the 19th Century, eisengarn was used as a weaving yarn and for making lace, ribbons and lining materials. The yarn is also known as Glanzgarn ('gloss' or 'glazed' yarn) and can be knitted into woollen clothing and other textiles to add shiny highlights.

Eyelash
Eyelash yarn is made from a polyester fiber with a furry texture resembling eyelashes. These novelty yarns are made of a thin central ply surrounded by short "hairs". This yarn differs from "fur" type yarn in that it contains evenly spaced threads at intervals between lengths of bare core thread, whereas fur yarns have an abundance of threads covering the entirety of the core thread. Eyelash yarn comes in a wide range of colors, with the "hairs" sometimes being made of multicolored or metallic fibers.

Ladder
Ladder yarn resembles a ladder, with two flat threads representing the two sides of the ladder held together by a strip of material at the center that represents the rungs. The material at the center of ladder yarn can be metallic, beaded, or otherwise adorned. This type of yarn is more often used to create trim or embellishments than to knit or crochet entire garments.

Metallic fiber
Metallic fibers are often classified as fancy yarns and are created by adding a metallic fiber or yarn to the blend. These are not to be confused with actual wire used in jewellery that is sometimes knit or crocheted.

Nub
A nub is a small bump or knot created by tightly twisting the fiber around the base fiber. The nub is most easily identified when the effect and base yarns are of different colors.

Plarn
Plastic yarn, or “plarn”, is constructed from plastic bags, large toilet paper and other commodity wrappers (e.g. planting soils sacks etc.); it can be used to weave, knit or crochet plastic mats, baskets, small bags and totes of all kinds.

Ribbon
Ribbon yarn resembles a ribbon. It can be made from synthetic or natural fibers, such as silk or cotton. Some ribbon yarns are flat, while others are tubular in construction.

Slub

A slub or thick spot in a yarn is created by varying the tightness of the twist of the yarn at various intervals.

References

Yarn
Knitting
Crochet
Weaving